Mal/3: Sounds is an album by American jazz pianist Mal Waldron recorded in 1958 and released on the New Jazz label.

Reception
The Allmusic review by Scott Yanow awarded the album 3 stars stating "The music is not essential but holds one's interest throughout".

Track listing
All compositions by Mal Waldron except as indicated
 "Tension" — 6:37
 "Ollie's Caravan" — 8:39
 "The Cattin' Toddler" — 6:58
 "Portrait of a Young Mother" - 8:58
 "For Every Man There's a Woman" (Harold Arlen, Leo Robin) — 11:40
Recorded at Rudy Van Gelder Studio in Englewood Cliffs, New Jersey on January 31, 1958.

Personnel
 Mal Waldron — piano
 Art Farmer — trumpet
 Eric Dixon — flute
 Calo Scott — cello
 Julian Euell — bass
 Elvin Jones — drums
 Elaine Waldron — vocals (tracks 4 & 5)

References

New Jazz Records albums
Mal Waldron albums
1958 albums
Albums recorded at Van Gelder Studio